El Otro Cristóbal is a 1963 Cuban film directed by Armand Gatti. It was entered into the 1963 Cannes Film Festival.

Cast
 Bertina Acevedo
 Jean Bouise
 Pierre Chaussat
 Marc Dudicourt
 Alden Knight
 Eslinda Núñez
 Carlos Ruiz de la Tejera

See also 
 List of Cuban films

References

External links

1963 films
1960s Spanish-language films
Cuban black-and-white films